Sanjeev Pandey (born 22 April 1974) is an Indian actor who appears in TV serials like Porus (TV series) and Sasural Simar Ka. He is famous for playing Bessus in TV series Porus (TV series). Pandey played the role of Sujoy in Abhishek Bachchan's The Big Bull.

Television

Filmography

References

External links
 

1974 births
Indian male television actors
Living people
Indian male actors
Male actors from Mumbai
Actors from Mumbai
21st-century Indian actors